William McAdam Semple (born 2 November 1946 in Bellshill, North Lanarkshire) is a former Scottish professional footballer.

In his playing career he played for Rangers, Durban United, Dundee, Hong Kong Rangers, San Antonio Thunder, Seiko, Bulova and South China. He was also selected to represent Scotland at schoolboy international level.

References

External links

NASL stats

1946 births
Albion Rovers F.C. players
Dundee F.C. players
Expatriate footballers in Hong Kong
Expatriate soccer players in South Africa
Expatriate soccer players in the United States
Living people
North American Soccer League (1968–1984) players
Scottish expatriate sportspeople in South Africa
Scottish expatriate sportspeople in the United States
Rangers F.C. players
Scottish expatriate sportspeople in Hong Kong
San Antonio Thunder players
Scottish expatriate footballers
Scottish Football League players
Scottish footballers
Association football midfielders